Fremont is a city in Newaygo County, Michigan, United States. The population was 4,516 at the time of the 2020 census.

History 
The first inhabitants of the Fremont area were Native Americans. A group of settlers led by Daniel Weaver first settled the area in 1855, the Weaver homestead serving as the first post office and public school. In November 1855, Fremont Township was established and named in honor of John C. Fremont, western explorer and Republican Party candidate for United States President. Weaver and his fellow settlers cleared the dense timber in order to farm. Early in the 1870s, Dutch immigrant families came from Holland and Muskegon, Michigan; and Fremont continues to recognize its early Dutch heritage in local festivals and pageants.

Due to rich stands of virgin timber, lumbering became a major industry, and a railroad spur soon linked Fremont to the national rail network. The lumbering industry declined in the 1860s because of the American Civil War; and in 1871, Fremont experienced a major forest fire that caused extensive damage, especially to the lumber mills. Nevertheless, Fremont rebuilt and was even able to supply some lumber to rebuild Chicago after the Great Fire of 1871.

Geography

Demographics

2010 census
As of the census of 2010, there were 4,081 people, 1,781 households, and 1,107 families living in the city. The racial makeup of the city was 94.5% White, 0.5% African American, 0.3% Native American, 1.1% Asian, 0.1% Pacific Islander, 2.2% from other races, and 1.3% from two or more races. Hispanic or Latino of any race were 4.6% of the population.

There were 1,781 households, of which 29.4% had children under the age of 18 living with them, 43.6% were married couples living together, 14.8% had a female householder with no husband present, 3.8% had a male householder with no wife present, and 37.8% were non-families. 33.5% of all households were made up of individuals, and 14.7% had someone living alone who was 65 years of age or older. The average household size was 2.27 and the average family size was 2.88.

The median age in the city was 39.5 years. 25.1% of residents were under the age of 18; 8.3% were between the ages of 18 and 24; 22.8% were from 25 to 44; 24.6% were from 45 to 64; and 19.4% were 65 years of age or older. The gender makeup of the city was 44.7% male and 55.3% female.

2000 census
As of the census of 2000, there were 4,224 people, 1,788 households, and 1,140 families living in the city. The racial makeup of the city was 96.59% White, 0.38% African American, 0.50% Native American, 0.99% Asian, 0.05% Pacific Islander, 0.47% from other races, and 1.02% from two or more races. Hispanic or Latino of any race were 1.96% of the population.

There were 1,788 households, out of which 30.1% had children under the age of 18 living with them, 50.0% were married couples living together, 11.4% had a female householder with no husband present, and 36.2% were non-families. 32.4% of all households were made up of individuals, and 16.9% had someone living alone who was 65 years of age or older. The average household size was 2.34 and the average family size was 2.97.

In the city, the population was spread out, with 26.9% under the age of 18, 7.9% from 18 to 24, 25.2% from 25 to 44, 20.4% from 45 to 64, and 19.6% who were 65 years of age or older. The median age was 37 years. For every 100 females, there were 82.2 males. For every 100 females age 18 and over, there were 76.4 males.

The median income for a household in the city was $32,246, and the median income for a family was $42,578. Males had a median income of $37,872 versus $23,203 for females. The per capita income for the city was $19,475. About 8.8% of families and 12.2% of the population were below the poverty line, including 20.0% of those under age 18 and 7.5% of those age 65 or over.

Economy
Gerber Products Company is located in Fremont. The Gerber Products Company was originally started as the Fremont Canning Company. Fremont is known as "The Baby Food Capital of the World". Fremont holds the Annual National Baby Food Festival every third week of July, where over 50,000 people visit Fremont every year.

Media

FM

Infrastructure

Transportation

Notable people 

 Joe Berger, former center for the Minnesota Vikings of the National Football League.
 Lola Blanc, American singer and model.
 Theodore I. Fry, Michigan State Treasurer.
 Dan Gerber, American poet.
 Frank Daniel Gerber, founder of the Fremont Canning Company, and later the Gerber Products Company.
 Alex Gorsky, CEO of Johnson & Johnson.
 Bert Zagers, former running back and defensive back for the Washington Redskins of the National Football League.

References

External links
 Fremont Public Schools Homepage
 City of Fremont (city government)
 Fremont Area Chamber of Commerce
 Fremont Area District Library

Cities in Newaygo County, Michigan
Grand Rapids metropolitan area
Populated places established in 1855
1855 establishments in Michigan